Bruno Fuchs may refer to:
 Bruno Fuchs (politician)
 Bruno Fuchs (footballer)